Veris Residential, Inc. is a real estate investment trust headquartered in Jersey City, New Jersey that invests primarily in commercial real estate in New Jersey.

As of December 31, 2022, it owned or had interests in 24 apartment complexes, 5 office buildings, 4 parking/retail properties, and two hotels. With the exception of a few properties in New York and Massachusetts, all of the properties are in New Jersey.

The company was formerly known as Mack-Cali Realty Corporation.

Investments
Notable investments owned by the company include:
 Harborside, on the Hudson Waterfront in Jersey City, is a multi-building mixed-use development. In October 2016, the company unveiled plans to build Harborside 4, a 1.2 million-square-foot office tower, in a joint venture with SJP Properties.
 Marbella Apartments is the 17th tallest building in Jersey City. When it was completed in 2003, it was the tallest residential building in New Jersey. It is now ranked 26th on the list of tallest buildings in Jersey City.
 Jersey City Urby broke ground on January 15, 2014 with joint venture partner Ironstate Development Company to consist of 3 towers of 69 stories each containing 763 apartments, or 2,359 apartments in total. The first tower, Urby Harborside 1, was topped off in September 2015.

History
The company was founded in 1949 as Cali Associates by John J. Cali, Angelo R. Cali, and Edward Leshowitz.

In the 1950s, Cali Associates was a developer of single family homes in northern New Jersey.

In 1969, the company completed construction of its first office building, 14 Commerce Drive, in Cranford Business Park, Cranford, New Jersey.

During the 1970s and 1980s, Cali Associates capitalized on increasing population and commerce in New Jersey by building 2.2 million square feet of class A office space.

In August 1994, Cali Associates became a public company through an initial public offering of stock, and it changed its name to Cali Realty Corporation, under a  management headed by Brant Cali, John R. Cali, and Thomas A. Rizk.

In 1997, Cali Realty acquired the Robert Martin Company for $211 million in cash and 1,401,225 operating-partnership units, then valued at $44 million, and the assumption of $185 million of debt. The transaction added 65 properties and 4.1 million square feet to its portfolio, mostly in Westchester County, New York, and Connecticut. In 2019, Robert Martin re-acquired most of the portfolio from Mack-Cali for $487.5 million.

In December 1997, Cali Realty Corporation completed a $1.2 billion merger with Patriot American Office Group and the Mack Company (founded by H. Bert Mack and operated by his four sons: Earle I. Mack, William L. Mack, Fredric H. Mack, and David S. Mack). The company changed its named to Mack-Cali Realty Corporation. At the time, this merger was the largest real estate investment trust transaction.

Mitchell E. Hersh became a member of the board of directors in 1997. He became the chief executive officer (CEO) in 1999. In 2004, he became president of the company in addition to its CEO.

In 1998, the company acquired $450 million worth of office properties, which boosted its holdings by 12%. It also bought properties in Washington D.C. and Maryland and properties in the Southwest.

In 2006, the company acquired the Gale Company, a private real estate firm headquartered in New Jersey that owned 2.8 million-square-foot of office buildings.

In 2012, the company acquired Roseland Partners, a property developer in New Jersey, for $134.6 million. It was developing the $120 million RiverTrace waterfront tower at Port Imperial, which was completed in October 2013.

In 2013, the company sold 19 Skyline Drive for $17.5 million.

In November 2014, Roseland opened Portside at East Pier in East Boston. The second phase, which includes 550 luxury residences and 70,000 square feet of retail space, opened in 2018.

In 2015, Mitchell E. Rudin became CEO and Michael J. DeMarco became the company's president and chief operating officer. The same year, the company moved its headquarters to Jersey City.

In December 2021, the company changed its name to Veris Residential, Inc.

References

1994 initial public offerings
Companies based in Jersey City, New Jersey
Companies listed on the New York Stock Exchange
Real estate companies established in 1997
Real estate investment trusts of the United States
Residential real estate